Akoli may refer to:
Akoli, Ghana
Akoli, Greece, a beach area in the northern part of Achaea, Greece
Akoli (stream), in Uganda